Dubravko Mataković (born 20 August 1959) is a Croatian illustrator best known for his grotesque comic books.

Mataković was born in Ivankovo near Vinkovci, and graduated from the Academy of Fine Arts, University of Zagreb in 1983. He has published comics since 1984. His work was published in the newspapers Nedjeljna Dalmacija, Jutarnji list, as well as children's newspapers Smib and Modra lasta.

One of his most popular characters was Protman, a mutant crime-fighting superhero who is able to fly, propelled by his intestinal gasses.

In 2003, Mataković co-founded heavy metal band called Septica, that published an eponymous album Septica for Aquarius Records in 2006.

The city theatre in Vinkovci produced a play based on Mataković's strip characters, in which Mataković himself produced the scene, costumes and most of the music.

References

1959 births
Living people
Croatian illustrators
Croatian comics artists
Croatian comics writers
People from Vinkovci